The third season of the CBS action-adventure series MacGyver premiered on September 28, 2018 for the 2018–19 television season. The series centers on the fictional Phoenix Foundation which is a covert organization masquerading as a think tank. The series stars Lucas Till, George Eads, Tristin Mays, and Justin Hires. Eads departed in "Father + Bride + Betrayal". CBS announced the series on April 28, 2018 for a twenty-two episode third season. The season premiere, "Improvise", brought in 5.77 million viewers.

Cast and characters

Main
 Lucas Till as Angus "Mac" MacGyver
 George Eads as Jack Dalton
 Tristin Mays as Riley Davis
 Justin Hires as Wilt Bozer
 Meredith Eaton as Matilda "Matty" Webber

Recurring
 William Baldwin as Elwood Davis
 Tate Donovan as James MacGyver/"Oversight"
 Reign Edwards as Leanna Martin
 Levy Tran as Desiree "Desi" Nguyen

Guest Stars
Peter Weller as Elliot Mason/Bad MacGyver
Chad Michael Collins as Lt. Robert Reese; MacGyver's friend
Presilah Nunez as ATF Agent Maria Ramirez with ATF K-9; MacGyver's friend
Michael Des Barres as Nicholas Helman
Brendan Hines as Ethan Raines; Matty's Husband
Lance Gross as Billy Colton
Sheryl Lee Ralph as Mama Colton
David Dastmalchian as Dennis Murdoc
David Bianchi as Oscar
Mo Gallini as Daris

Episodes

The number in the "No. overall" column refers to the episode's number within the overall series, whereas the number in the "No. in season" column refers to the episode's number within this particular season. "U.S. viewers (millions)" refers to the number of viewers in the U.S. in millions who watched the episode as it was aired.

Production

Development

On April 18, 2018, CBS renewed MacGyver for a third season. When CBS announced its fall schedule it was revealed that the series would keep its timeslot of Fridays at 8 pm (ET). The season premiered on September 28, 2018, and is expected to contain twenty-two episodes.

Filming
The series continues to be produced in Atlanta, Georgia, filming at Mailing Avenue Stageworks in Chosewood Park.

Casting
The season features five starring roles, all five of which returned from the first season. Isabel Lucas is the only main cast member not to return from the second season following her departure in "CO2 Sensor + Tree Branch". In addition, George Eads departed the series in the fourteenth episode. Levy Tran was cast in a recurring role as Desiree Nguyen to replace Eads.

Reception

Critical reception
Rotten Tomatoes, a review aggregator website gives the series a user rating of 3.4 out of 5 based on twenty-seven reviews.

Ratings

References

MacGyver
2018 American television seasons
2019 American television seasons